Swedlund is a Swedish surname. Notable people with the surname include:

 Alan C. Swedlund (born 1943), American anthropologist and academic
 Nils Swedlund (1898–1965), General and Supreme Commander of the Swedish Armed Forces, uncle of Sten (see below)
 Sten Swedlund (1937–2014), Rear Admiral and Chief of the Coastal Fleet, nephew of Nils (see above)

Swedish-language surnames